Ninde may be,

Ninde language
Ninde, Virginia
William Xavier Ninde
Barbara Ninde Byfield